Nick Budd, better known by his stage name Buddy Peace, is an English hip hop producer and DJ from London. He has been the resident DJ for Lex Records and Strange Famous Records.

Career
Buddy Peace released the mixtape, Wolf Diesel Mountain, in 2008. He released Working Man, a collaborative album with the rapper Prolyphic, on Strange Famous Records in early 2013. Kraftwerking Man followed later that year.

Discography

Albums
 Late Model Sedan (2009)
 Working Man (2013) with Prolyphic

Mixtapes
 A Friendly Game of Chess (2003) with Zilla
 Watch And Repeat Play (2004) with Zilla
 A Crew Called Self (2004)
 Commonwealth Kids (2006) with Carlo
 Bully Records Megamix (2006)
 Wolf Diesel Mountain (2008)
 Dirty Urban Birds (2008)
 Holy Chrome (2009)
 You Don't Have to Do This (2011)
 Go to Hell, Bastards! (2011)
 Hot Pudding (2012)
 Buddy & Muddy & Wolf (2012)
 A.D.D. (2012)
 Stop Smiling (2012)
 Go Mean! (2013)
 Atoms for Buddy Peace (2013)
 Kraftwerking Man (2013)
 Desert Sessions (2013)
 Desert Sessions Remixes: The Instrumentals (2013)
 Sons of Bitches / Ten Horn Core (2014)

Guest appearances
 Buck 65 - Dirtbike (2008)
 Sage Francis - "Sea Legs" from Sick of Wasting (2009)
 B. Dolan - "Mr. Buddy Buddy" from Fallen House, Sunken City (2010)
 2Mex - "What You Know About" from My Fanbase Will Destroy You (2010)
 Buck 65 - "Gee Whiz", "Zombie Delight" and "Lights Out" from 20 Odd Years (2011)
 Noah23 - "Old Dog" from Fry Cook on Venus (2011)
 Sole - "Donald Trump in a Gilded Age" from Nuclear Winter Volume 2: Death Panel (2011)
 Sage Francis - "Blue" and "Viva La Vinyl" from Sick to D(eat)h (2013)

Productions
 Sage Francis - "Needle" and "Pump" from Sick of Wasting (2009)
 B. Dolan - House of Bees Vol. 1 (2010)
 B. Dolan - House of Bees Vol. 2 (2012)
 Sage Francis - "You Can't Win", "Breaking 2Bad" and "Origin to Descent" from Sick to D(eat)h (2013)

Remixes
 Dave House - "Weeknights and Weekends (Buddy Peace Remix)" from Kingston's Current (2004)
 Sil-X - "Sil-X (Buddy Peace's 'Tech Noir' Remix)" (2008)
 This Is the Kit - "Earthquake (Buddy Peace Faulty Lines Remix)" (2011)
 2econd Class Citizen - "Liberated Lady (Buddy Peace Remix)" from Outside Your Doorway (2012)

References

External links
 
 

Alternative hip hop musicians
English DJs
Hip hop record producers
Musicians from London